Niko Gießelmann (born 26 September 1991) is a German footballer who plays as a left-back for Bundesliga club Union Berlin.

Career
Gießelmann joined 2. Bundesliga side Greuther Fürth on a free transfer in summer 2013, signing a three-year contract until 2016.

In June 2017, Gießelmann moved to league rivals on a three-year deal.

Career statistics

References

External links
 

1991 births
Living people
German footballers
Association football defenders
Hannover 96 players
Hannover 96 II players
SpVgg Greuther Fürth players
Fortuna Düsseldorf players
1. FC Union Berlin players
Bundesliga players
2. Bundesliga players
Regionalliga players
Footballers from Hanover